Moskvyata is a rural locality (a village) in Vereshchaginsky District, Perm Krai, Russia. The population was 11 as of 2010.

Geography 
Moskvyata is located 20 km east of Vereshchagino (the district's administrative centre) by road. Kozhevniki is the nearest rural locality.

References 

Rural localities in Vereshchaginsky District